John Shea (born 1949) is an American actor, film producer and stage director.

John Shea may also refer to:

 John Shea (mobster) (born 1965), Irish-American former mobster
 John Gilmary Shea (1824–1892), American historian
 John Joseph Shea, Lieutenant Commander in the United States Navy during the 1930s and 1940s, namesake of the USS Shea
 John J. Shea Jr. (1924–2015), American ear surgeon
 John Shea (New Hampshire politician), American politician on the New Hampshire Executive Council
 John Shea Jr. (1928–2013), American politician, jurist, and businessman
 John Shea (Newfoundland politician) (1803–1858), journalist and political figure in Colony of Newfoundland
 John Shea (baseball) (1904–1956), American professional baseball pitcher in the late 1920s
 John Shea (cricketer) (1913–1986), Australian cricketer
 John Shea (playwright) (born 1964), American playwright
 John Shea (Indian Army officer) (1869–1966), British officer in the Indian Army
 John Shea (archeologist) (born 1960), American archaeologist and paleoanthropologist
 John Shea, a broadcaster with BBC World Service and, since 1994, with BBC Radio 3
 John Shea, longtime Harvard library official

See also
John O'Shea (disambiguation)